Moung Ruessei ("Mace of Bamboo") is a district (srok) of Battambang province, in north-western Cambodia. The capital lies at the town of Moung Ruessei.

Administration 
The district is subdivided into 9 communes (khum).

Communes and villages

References 

 
Districts of Battambang province